I Made Kadek Wardana (born December 31, 1981 in Ubud, Bali) is a retired Indonesian footballer who played as a goalkeeper.

Honours

Club
Arema Cronus
East Java Governor Cup: 2013
Menpora Cup: 2013
Indonesian Inter Island Cup: 2014/15

References

External links

1981 births
Association football goalkeepers
Living people
Indonesian footballers
Balinese sportspeople
Liga 1 (Indonesia) players
Pelita Jaya FC players
Arema F.C. players
Bali United F.C. players
Sportspeople from Bali